Six Stories is a short story collection by Stephen King, published in 1997 by Philtrum Press. It is limited to 1100 copies, which are signed and numbered. Six Stories contains:

 "Lunch at the Gotham Cafe" (later published as part of Everything's Eventual, slightly revised)
 "L. T.'s Theory of Pets" (later published as part of Everything's Eventual)
 "Luckey Quarter" (later published as part of Everything's Eventual)
 "Autopsy Room Four" (later published as part of Everything's Eventual)
 "Blind Willie" (later published as part of Hearts in Atlantis, heavily revised)
 "The Man in the Black Suit" (later published as part of Everything's Eventual, slightly revised)

See also

Short fiction by Stephen King

External links
'Six Stories' at HorrorKing.com

1997 short story collections
American short story collections
Short story collections by Stephen King
Philtrum Press books